Salwa Abu Khadra (born 1929) is a Palestinian politician and educator who is a member of the Palestine Liberation Organization (PLO) and Fatah where she has held various posts. She is part of the first generation women leaders of both groups.

Biography
Abu Khadra was born in Jaffa in 1929. Her family is from Gaza. In 1948 they had to leave Jaffa and settled in Damascus.

Abu Khadra completed his secondary education at Saint Joseph Sisters School in Jaffa in 1945. She obtained a certificate in education from the University of Oxford in 1947 and a degree in French literature from Saint Joseph University in 1952. Later she settled in Kuwait and played a significant role in the education of Palestinian girls. She established the first nursery school in Kuwait. She also founded a private school in Kuwait where she worked until 1990. She left Kuwait due to the Gulf War in 1991 and settled in Egypt where her daughter had been living.

Abu Khadra's political career began when she joined Fatah in 1965. The same year she took part in the establishment of Palestinian women council. In 1967 she became a board member of the General Union of Palestinian Women. She has been a member of the Palestinian Higher Council for Culture, Science and Education since 1976 and a member of the revolutionary council of Fatah since 1980. She also served as a member of the PLO's central committee. She was appointed secretary general of the General Union of Palestinian Women and also, of the women bureau of Fatah. She served as a member of the Consultative Committee of the Palestinian Constitution. Abu Khadra headed the Palestinian delegation at the second conference on women of the United Nations in 1980.

References

20th-century Palestinian women politicians 
21st-century Palestinian women politicians 
1929 births
Living people
Fatah members
People from Jaffa
Alumni of the University of Oxford
Saint Joseph University alumni
Palestinian educators
Palestinian emigrants to Egypt
School founders